The Peter G. Peterson Foundation is an American billionaire-funded foundation established in 2008 by Peter G. Peterson, former US Secretary of Commerce in the Nixon Administration and co-founder of the Blackstone Group, an American financial-services company.

History
In 2008, Peter G. Peterson committed $1 billion to create the Peter G. Peterson Foundation, an organization dedicated to addressing economic and fiscal "sustainability challenges that threaten America's future." Peterson recruited David M. Walker, then-Comptroller General of the United States and head of the Government Accountability Office, as the foundation's first president and chief executive officer.

In 2010, the foundation launched an annual Washington, D.C., event aimed to draw attention to America's long-term fiscal issues.

In October 2010, David M. Walker stepped down as President and CEO of the Peter G. Peterson Foundation to establish his own venture, the Comeback America Initiative with funding provided by the Foundation.

Leadership
Source:

Board of Directors:
 Michael A. Peterson, Chairman and Chief Operating Officer
 Joan Ganz Cooney, Peter G. Peterson's widow, co-founder of Sesame Workshop

Advisory Board:
 Sen. Bill Bradley, Managing Director: Allen & Company LLC; former United States Senator
 Barry Diller, Chairman, IAC/InterActiveCorp
 Harvey V. Fineberg, President: Institute of Medicine
 Sec. Robert Rubin: Co-Chairman, Council on Foreign Relations; former United States Secretary of the Treasury
 Sheryl Sandberg, Chief Operating Officer: Facebook
 Sec. Donna Shalala, President: University of Miami; former United States Secretary of Health and Human Services
 Sec. George Shultz, Thomas W & Susan B. Ford Distinguished Fellow: Hoover Institution – Stanford University; former United States Secretary of State

Past activities

Solutions Initiative
In January 2011, The Peter G. Peterson Foundation launched the $1.2 million Solutions Initiative grant program. As part of this program, the American Enterprise Institute, Bipartisan Policy Center, Center for American Progress, Economic Policy Institute, Heritage Foundation and Roosevelt Institute Campus Network each received grants of $200,000 to develop comprehensive plans for long-term fiscal sustainability. Grantees had complete discretion and independence to develop their own fiscal goals or targets and to propose recommended packages of solutions and timeframes for achieving them.

The six Solutions Initiative plans contained specific policy recommendations, reflecting the groups' unique perspectives and priorities, and looked out 10 and 25 years into the future. To make the plans more easily comparable, the Solutions Initiative program required that they be developed from a common starting point based upon the Congressional Budget Office's long-term projections. The Peterson Foundation also asked the Tax Policy Center and Barry Anderson (former acting director at CBO) to serve as independent scorekeepers, reviewing the plans and applying consistent analytical techniques to all of the proposals.

The six Solutions Initiative plans were released at the 2011 Fiscal Summit.

(2012) Post-Election: The Fiscal Cliff and Beyond
On November 16, 2012, the Peterson Foundation hosted Post Election: The Fiscal Cliff and Beyond, which convened elected officials and policy experts to discuss implications of the impending fiscal cliff and potential paths forward within the context of the nation's political and economic challenges.
Participants included former Chairmen of the Federal Reserve Alan Greenspan and Paul Volcker, Director of the National Economic Council Gene Sperling, Representatives Peter Roskam and Chris Van Hollen, former acting Director of the Congressional Budget Office Donald B. Marron Jr., and former Director of the Office of Management and Budget Peter Orzag.
Policy analysts from the five think tanks that participated in the Solutions II Initiative took part in a panel in which they reviewed their plans and budget priorities.

(2011) Republican Primary Debate Sponsorship
The Peterson Foundation was the official broadcast sponsor of the 2011 Bloomberg/Washington Post Presidential Debate at Dartmouth College in Hanover, New Hampshire. The debate, the first of the 2012 presidential election season to focus entirely on the economy and fiscal issues, was moderated in a roundtable format by PBS' Charlie Rose, Washington Post political correspondent Karen Tumulty and Bloomberg TV White House correspondent Julianna Goldman.

As part of its sponsorship, the Foundation aired a series of informational advertisements during the debate. The ads featured children speaking to specific long-term fiscal challenges and the future effects of failing to address the U.S. debt. The final ad concluded with a message from former Sens. Bill Bradley (D-N.J.) and Judd Gregg (R-N.H.) encouraging congressional leaders to work together and develop a bipartisan plan that addresses the national debt.

OweNo
In November 2010, the Peterson Foundation launched a $6 million national campaign to raise awareness about the U.S. debt titled "OweNo." The campaign featured nationally broadcast television ads starring satirical presidential candidate named Hugh Jidette, (a play on "Huge Debt").

I.O.U.S.A.
In August 2008, The Peter G. Peterson Foundation purchased the rights to I.O.U.S.A., a documentary that examined the history and events behind America's rapidly growing national debt.

See also

 United States public debt
 Government debt
 Government budget deficits
 List of foundations

References

Further reading

External links
 

2008 establishments in New York City
Political and economic research foundations in the United States
Organizations based in Manhattan
Political and economic think tanks in the United States
Think tanks established in 2008